Business is a 1960 French film directed by Maurice Boutel and starring Colette Renard, Pierre Doris and Marcel Charvey.

Cast
 Colette Renard as Léa  
 Pierre Doris as Papillon  
 Marcel Charvey as Ludovic  
 Pauline Carton as Clotilde  
 Fernand Sardou as Commissaire Masson  
 Junie Astor as L'avocate  
 Milly Mathis  as Honorine 
 Christel Dynel 
 Rui Gomes 
 Fernand Kindt 
 Fernand Molais 
 Fernand Rauzéna

References

Bibliography 
 Philippe Rège. Encyclopedia of French Film Directors, Volume 1. Scarecrow Press, 2009.

External links 
 

1960 films
French drama films
1960s French-language films
Films directed by Maurice Boutel
1960s French films